A Sweet Scent of Death is a 1999 drama film directed by Gabriel Retes based on the novel of the same name by Guillermo Arriaga who also wrote the screenplay. It was entered into the 21st Moscow International Film Festival. It is a co-production among companies from Mexico, Spain, and Argentina.

Cast

See also 
 List of Mexican films of 1999
 List of Spanish films of 1999
 List of Argentine films of 1999

References

External links
 
 

1999 films
1999 drama films
1990s Spanish-language films
Films directed by Gabriel Retes
Films with screenplays by Guillermo Arriaga
Films based on Mexican novels
Mexican drama films
Spanish drama films
Argentine drama films
1990s Spanish films
1990s Mexican films